953 West is an album by the Siegel–Schwall Band.  Their third album on the Wooden Nickel Records label, and their seventh album overall, it was recorded at Paragon Recording Studios in Chicago in August 1973, and was released later that year.  It was re-released as a CD, by Wounded Bird Records, in 1999.

The title of the album refers to the Quiet Knight, a music venue where the Siegel–Schwall Band performed many times, which was located at 953 West Belmont Avenue in Chicago.  The album cover art depicts the platform of the nearby Belmont 'L' station.

Track listing
Side one

Side two

Personnel

Siegel–Schwall Band
Corky Siegel – piano, harmonica, vocals
Jim Schwall – guitar, vocals
Rollo Radford – bass, vocals
Shelly Plotkin – drums, percussion

Production
Siegel–Schwall Band – producer
Barry Mraz – producer, engineer
Bill Traut – supervision
Eddie Balchowsky – cover art and poem

References

Siegel–Schwall Band albums
1973 albums